Parliamentary elections were held in the Kingdom of Croatia-Slavonia on 28 October 1910 to elect the members of the Sabor. The elections were called by ban Nikola Tomašić after the adoption of a new Law of the Electoral Order.

Results

Elected representatives

Croatian Peoples' Peasant Party
Vinko Lovreković

Party of Rights
Franjo Hrustić

Notes

References
Ivo Perić, Hrvatski državni sabor 1848.-2000. 2nd volume. Dom i svijet. Zagreb, 2000. (pg. 372)

Elections in Croatia
Croatia
1910 in Croatia
Elections in Austria-Hungary
October 1910 events
Kingdom of Croatia-Slavonia
Election and referendum articles with incomplete results